Nasarkan-e Olya (also Romanized as Naşarkān-e ‘Olyā; also known as Naşarkān) is a village in Shirang Rural District, Kamalan District, Aliabad County, Golestan Province, Iran. At the 2006 census, its population was 542, in 123 families.

References 

Populated places in Aliabad County